Stilbosis quadricustatella is a moth in the family Cosmopterigidae. It is found in North America, where it has been recorded from Arkansas, Florida, Illinois, Mississippi and Texas.

References

Natural History Museum Lepidoptera generic names catalog

Chrysopeleiinae
Moths of North America
Moths described in 1880